Cameron Johnston (born 6 December 1970 in Smithers, British Columbia) is an Australian freestyle wrestler. He competed for Australia at the 2000 Summer Olympics.

References

External links
 

1970 births
Australian people of Canadian descent
Australian male sport wrestlers
Living people
Olympic wrestlers of Australia
People from Smithers, British Columbia
Sportspeople from British Columbia
Wrestlers at the 2000 Summer Olympics
Canadian male sport wrestlers